Northeast Wisconsin Technical College (NWTC) is a public technical college with multiple locations in Wisconsin. The college serves nine Wisconsin counties with three campuses in Green Bay, Marinette, and Sturgeon Bay and five regional learning centers in Shawano, Oconto Falls, Crivitz, Aurora, and Luxemburg. It is part of the Wisconsin Technical College System. The college serves approximately 41,500 students annually.

Academics

NWTC offers over 100 associate degrees, technical diplomas and apprenticeships, and 84 certificates. The college also offers employee training, technical assistance, and consulting through the Corporate Training and Economic Development department. From 2010–2011, NWTC served 1,084 businesses with customized training either on site or in the classroom, training 20,083 employees.

History

Wisconsin's technical colleges were founded to train the work force. In the early 1900s, most workers in Wisconsin received their education through the apprenticeship system—both job skills and academic skills. In order to standardize the education these working young adults received in reading, writing, and math, the state of Wisconsin promoted the creation of city vocational schools. Schools sprang up in Green Bay and Marinette in 1912, followed in 1941 by a school in Sturgeon Bay. Their scope expanded to include adults of all ages who were interested in technical careers, regardless of whether they were in the workforce. In 1968, the three schools merged to become a single district in the Wisconsin Technical College System, serving part or all of nine counties under the name Northeast Wisconsin Technical Institute. This name was changed in the late 1980s to Northeast Wisconsin Technical College.

References

External links

Official website

Educational institutions established in 1912
Wisconsin technical colleges
Education in Green Bay, Wisconsin
Education in Marinette County, Wisconsin
Education in Door County, Wisconsin
1912 establishments in Wisconsin